The Kalteiche near Wilgersdorf is a hill, in the German state of North Rhine-Westphalia. It lies within the county of Siegen-Wittgenstein and is one of the higher summits in the Rothaar Mountains and the highest point in the municipality of Wilnsdorf.

References 

Mountains and hills of the Rothaar
Siegen-Wittgenstein
Natural regions of the Süder Uplands